Anthony Ibe Onyearugbulem  (1955–2002) was a Nigerian navy captain who served as military administrator of Ondo State (August 1996 – August 1998) during the military regime of General Sani Abacha. He then became military administrator of Edo State in August 1998, handing over power to the civilian governor Lucky Igbinedion in May 1999.

Background

Anthony Ibe Onyearugbulem was born on 9 July 1955 in Owalla Avuvu in Ikeduru, Imo State. He was educated at St. Columbia's Secondary School, Amaimo (1970–1972) and Enyiogugu High School, Mbaise (1972–1974). He joined the navy and was commissioned on July 1, 1978.

Military administrator

Onyearugbulem served as military administrator of Ondo State from August 1996 to August 1998.
As administrator of Ondo state, he caused resentment among the Auga people by presenting the staff of office to the Alani of Idoani, a person said by some to have no royal blood.
His administration undertook extensive roadworks in Ondo State, and this is the legacy he is commonly remembered for.

He was promoted navy captain in July 1998 and was posted to Edo State on August 7, 1998, as the military administrator.
He tried to make chairmanship of the council of Obas in Edo State a rotational position, an affront to the king of the ancient Benin Kingdom.
In an attempt to increase voters' registration before the scheduled transition to democracy, Onyearugbulem warned that parents and guardians would have to produce their registration cards for their children to be admitted to state schools.

Later career

He was made to retire in 1999 shortly after the advent of civilian rule, along with others who had held political appointments in the military government.
In 2002, Onyearugbulem left the People's Democratic Party (PDP) and declared his intention to run in 2003 for governor of Imo State on the All Nigeria Peoples Party (ANPP) platform.
Later that year, Onyearugbulem died suddenly in a hotel room in Kaduna in somewhat mysterious circumstances.

References

Nigerian Navy officers
1955 births
2002 deaths
Governors of Ondo State
Governors of Edo State
Peoples Democratic Party (Nigeria) politicians
All Nigeria Peoples Party politicians
Igbo people